Little Beau Porky is a 1936 Warner Bros. Looney Tunes cartoon short directed by Frank Tashlin. The short was released on November 14, 1936, and stars Porky Pig.

In the cartoon, Porky is in the French Foreign Legion as a camel scrubber, but after fighting off the enemy, ends up as Commandant.

Plot
The cartoon opens on a fortress in the middle of a desert, home to the French Foreign Legion.  The Commandant enters and looks over his group of shoddy, under-developed service men, including Porky, who does not seem to be taking his service very literally.  In the inspection line he becomes lazy, and leans against the service man to his left.  The Commandant calls out for him, "Porky Pig!"  When he stands at attention, his heels click and he mistakenly trips the rest of the service men, and they all end up on the floor.  The Commandant is outraged, and orders every man to come to attention again.  The Commandant once again calls out for Porky and orders him to follow.  Porky imitates the Commandant and bumps into him, who then orders Porky to wash his camel.

A service man rides into the fortress on a camel to deliver to the Commandant a "Camelgram".  The cable, from General Sanflee, says that Ali Mode's Riff Raffs have attacked, and to "...come at once -- Time's a wastin!" The Commandant immediately calls his men to arms, and they all leave the fortress, weapons in hand.  Porky is on his way to fight the enemy, but the Commandant pulls his camel aside and asks, "Where do you think you are going?  We need men, not camel scrubbers!"  Porky is devastated, then angry and is left behind, uttering, "I'd rather be a camel scrubber than an old jingle-bell general!"  While Porky is grumbling about his treatment, he runs into a large wall-size Wanted poster of Ali Mode and is frightened by the disturbing image.

Soon after, thinking at any time Ali Mode might show up, Porky begins nailing the fortress door shut.  While hammering, he hears a knock coming from the other side of the door.  Porky is startled, and thinks his hammering is an echo.  The echo turns out to be Ali Mode who is standing outside the door, playing a trick on Porky.  He imitates Porky's yodel and pretends to be a lost sheep, so Porky opens the door's peephole to discover that it's Ali Mode who begs to be let in and slams the door shut.  Porky fights Ali and his henchmen off single-handed, and for his bravery, earns his place as a jingle-bell General.

Colorization
The film was colorized in 1968.  The method used to transfer the animation to a cel greatly decreased the quality of the original film.  This involved tracing over every second frame of the film onto a new cel and then painting the cel over a reproduction of the original background image.  It was again colorized using a computer to add color to a new print in 1992, preserving the quality of the original animation.  Note: the sign on the barrel of "Cairo syrup" was originally misspelled "CRIRO SYRUP"; this was corrected during restoration.

Music
"Fella with a Fiddle", by Charlie Abbott
"Am I Blue?", by Harry Akst

References

External links

1936 films
1936 animated films
Looney Tunes shorts
Warner Bros. Cartoons animated short films
Short films directed by Frank Tashlin
Porky Pig films
Films about the French Foreign Legion
Films set in deserts
American black-and-white films
1930s Warner Bros. animated short films
1930s English-language films